Tiago Manuel da Silva Maia  (born 18 September 1992) is a Portuguese footballer who plays for Lusitano Ginásio Clube Moncarapachense as a goalkeeper.

Club career
Born in Gondomar, Porto District, Maia was brought up at FC Porto. He spent the vast majority of his senior career in the third division, representing S.C. Espinho, S.C. Praiense and Louletano DC.

The exception to this happened in the 2014–15 and 2015–16 seasons, when Maia played with S.C. Olhanense in the Segunda Liga. His first appearance in the competition took place on 9 August 2014, in a 2–0 home win against Leixões SC. In 2012–13, he was not part of any club.

International career
Maia was part of the Portuguese under-20 squad that finished second at the 2011 FIFA World Cup, playing no matches in the tournament held in Colombia.

Honours
Portugal U20
FIFA U-20 World Cup runner-up: 2011

Orders
 Knight of the Order of Prince Henry

References

External links

Portuguese League profile 

1992 births
Living people
People from Gondomar, Portugal
Sportspeople from Porto District
Portuguese footballers
Association football goalkeepers
Liga Portugal 2 players
Campeonato de Portugal (league) players
FC Porto players
Padroense F.C. players
C.D. Santa Clara players
S.C. Espinho players
S.C. Olhanense players
S.C. Praiense players
Louletano D.C. players
Portugal youth international footballers